Shima is a town under the jurisdiction of Xingning City, Meizhou, in eastern Guangdong Province, China.

The name of the town "Shima", meaning "Rock Horse" in Chinese, is named by a rock like a horse going down the hill near the region.

References 

Township-level divisions of Guangdong
Xingning, Guangdong